Henry Page (born 16 November 1788 at Cambridge; date of death unknown) was an English professional cricketer who played first-class cricket from 1819 to 1826.  He was mainly associated with Cambridge Town Club and made 7 known appearances in first-class matches.

References

External links

Bibliography
 Arthur Haygarth, Scores & Biographies, Volume 1 (1744–1826), Lillywhite, 1862

1788 births
Date of death unknown
English cricketers
English cricketers of 1787 to 1825
Cambridge Town Club cricketers
Year of death missing